The Christian Social Party (PSC) is a Chilean political party founded in September 2022. It was formed by independent leaders and ex-militants of the defunct Christian Conservative Party (PCC).

History 
The community arose after the dissolution of the PCC, a group that during the 2021 parliamentary elections achieved the election of Sara Concha as deputy for the Ñuble Region under the Christian Social Front pact. Among its founders were Luciano Silva, a former National Renewal (RN) conventioneer, and Antaris Varela, who presided over the PCC.

Like its predecessor, the PSC is linked to evangelical and conservative church groups.

In November 2022, the community began its formation and constitution process before the Electoral Service (Servel). During that same month, the incorporation of Deputy Concha was confirmed, who until then was independent and a member of the RN bench in the Chamber of Deputies.

Leadership 
The Christian Social Party presented a provisional directive for its formation process as a political party, which is made up of:

 President: Ángel Roa.
 Secretary: Belén Núñez.
 Vice President: Geraldine Aravena.
 Adviser: Juan Carlos Venegas.
 Public relations officer: Carolina Barría.
 Treasurer: Eduardo Canto.

In the same way, it presented a Supreme Court made up of a president, a vice president, a secretary and three members.

Party authorities

Deputies 
The deputies, including militants and independents within the party caucus, for the 2022-2026 legislative period are:

References 

Political parties established in 2022
Conservatism in Chile
Christian political parties
Protestantism in Chile
Far-right politics in Chile